Pool and Tehidy is an electoral division of Cornwall in the United Kingdom which returns one member to sit on Cornwall Council. The current councillor is Conservative Philip Desmonde.

The current division is distinct from the division of the same name created in 2013, which was abolished at the 2021 local elections.

Councillors

2013-2021

2021-present

2021-present division

Extent
The current Pool and Tehidy division represents the villages of Pool and Illogan Highway, and the hamlets of South Tehidy, Roscroggan, Tolskithy, and Trevenson. The Tehidy manor is also included in the division, but much of the estate is part of the neighbouring Illogan and Portreath division. The hamlet of Penhallick is shared with the Four Lanes, Beacon and Troon division.

Election results

2021 election

2013-2021 division

Extent
Pool and Tehidy represented the village of Pool, and the hamlets of South Tehidy, Roscroggan, and Trevenson. The Tehidy manor was also included in the division, but much of the estate was part of the neighbouring Illogan division. The division covered 697 hectares in total.

Election results

2017 election

2013 election

Notes

References

Electoral divisions of Cornwall Council